This is a list of palatines of Hungary.  A palatine (Hungarian: nádorispán or nádor; also:  Croatian: ugarski palatin; German: Palatin; Slovak: nádvorný župan or nádvorný špán, later: palatín or nádvorník) was the highest-ranking dignitary in the Kingdom of Hungary after the King of Hungary from the kingdom's rise in the 11th century up to 1848–1918.

Age of Árpádian kings

1301–1310

Anjou Age

Age of kings of different houses

Age of Ottoman wars

In the Habsburg monarchy

See also

 List of heads of state of Hungary
 List of Hungarians
 List of prime ministers of Hungary
 List of rulers of Hungary

Palatines